East Chang'an Avenue is a major road in Beijing, China. It forms part of the extended Chang'an Avenue.

It leaves Tian'anmen Square heading east until the Dongdan intersection.

Easily recognised for the crossing with Wangfujing, Beijing's well-known commercial district, it also is home to the Beijing Hotel and the Grand Hotel Beijing. Various state organs and organisations also sit along its path.

Line 1 of the Beijing subway runs along the route.

Streets in Beijing